The 1878 South Australian Football Association season was the 2nd season of the top-level Australian rules football competition in South Australia.

Each team played each other twice this season, the first time a standardised fixture was in place.

In its first season,  won their first premiership, going through the year undefeated.

Pre season 
The SAFA clubs played inter club matches on 4 May.

An additional pre season game was played between some South Australian and Victorian residents who live in Adelaide.

Premiership season 
Premiership matches are those that took place after 11 May.

Round 1

Round 2

Round 3

Round 4

Round 5

Round 6

Round 7

Round 8

Round 9

Round 10

Round 11

Round 12

Round 13

Round 14

Round 15

Round 16

Round 17

Ladder

References 

SANFL
South Australian National Football League seasons